Nello as a name may refer to:

Nello Carrara (1900–1993), Italian physicist and founder of the Electromagnetic Wave Research Institute
Nello Celio (1914–1995), Swiss politician representing Canton Ticino
Nello Ciaccheri (1893–1971), Italian cyclist competing at the 1924 Summer Olympics
Nello Cristianini (born 1968), Professor of Artificial Intelligence at the University of Bristol
Nello Di Costanzo (born 1961), Italian football manager and former player
Nello Falaschi (1913–1986), American football player in the National Football League
Nello Lauredi (1924–2001), former professional French road bicycle racer
Nello Musumeci (born 1955), Italian politician and Member of the European Parliament for Islands
Nello Pagani (1911–2003), Italian Grand Prix motorcycle road racer and Formula One driver
Nello Pazzafini (1933–1997), Italian actor who appeared in gladiator movies and Spaghetti Westerns
Nello Rosselli (1900–1937), Italian Socialist leader and historian
Nello Russo (born 1981), Italian football (soccer) striker
Nello Santi (born 1931), Italian conductor
Nello Matías Sosa, Argentine football player
Nickname of C. L. R. James, Trinidadian journalist, historian, and socialist